Krishna Krishna Chettur ICS (10 March 1901 – 29 April 1956) was an Indian civil servant and diplomat who served as India's first ambassador to Japan.

Career
After university, during which he took an MA, Chettur entered the Indian Civil Service on 5 March 1925, serving in the Indian Audit Department. From October 1930 to April 1933, he was posted as a currency officer in Rangoon (now Yangon), the capital of British Burma (now Myanmar) and then a province of British India. From 1933 until May 1937, he served in the same role in Calcutta (now Kolkata) before being posted to the Finance Department of the Government of India as an under-secretary. He was promoted to deputy secretary (ex-officio) in April 1940 and to deputy secretary in the Commerce Department in August 1944. Following India's independence in August 1947, he rose to the officiating rank of a Secretary in the Commerce Department.

In March 1950, Chettur was posted to Tokyo as the Indian Political Representative in Japan and Head of the Indian Liaison Mission. On 28 April 1952, following India's official peace treaty with Japan, he was appointed as India's first Ambassador to Japan, and served in that role until 25 July 1952, when he was appointed Ambassador to Burma. In September 1954, he was appointed as Ambassador to Belgium, formally retiring from government service on his 55th birthday, but continuing to serve as Ambassador to Belgium. Just over a month later, while playing golf, he succumbed to a sudden heart attack in Brussels on 29 April 1956.

Personal life
Chettur was born into a distinguished political family. His uncle was Sir C. Sankaran Nair, a judge of the Madras High Court and the President of the Indian National Congress in 1897, who subsequently served as Advocate-General of the Madras Presidency from 1906 to 1908. Among his cousins was the Indian Army general Kunhiraman Palat Candeth.

Chettur's daughter Jaya Jaitly is a noted socialist politician and activist who founded the Samata Party; his granddaughter Aditi is married to cricketer Ajay Jadeja.

References

Indian civil servants
Indian Civil Service (British India) officers
Ambassadors of India to Luxembourg
Ambassadors of India to Japan
Ambassadors of India to Myanmar
Ambassadors of India to Belgium
Kerala politicians
Malayali people
1901 births
1956 deaths
20th-century Indian politicians